Ma'ruf Balkhi or Ma'rufi Balkhi was a Persian poet from Balkh, who was one of the first to compose poems in New Persian. Most of his work has perished, and only fragments have survived. He most likely flourished in the middle of the 10th-century, due to some of his work being dedicated to the Samanid ruler (amir) Abd al-Malik I (r. 954–961). He may also have been present at the court of the last Saffarid ruler of Sistan, Khalaf ibn Ahmad (r. 963–1002).

References

10th-century Persian-language poets
Year of birth unknown
10th-century deaths
10th-century Iranian people
Samanid-period poets
People from Balkh